The One Eyed Soldiers  is a 1966 United Kingdom/Yugoslavian/Italian/United States international co-production crime film shot in Yugoslavia that was directed and co-written by John Ainsworth under the name of Jean Christophe. The film, shot in Ultrascope starred and was co-produced by Dale Robertson for his United Screen Arts company that released the film in the USA as a double feature with Secret Agent Super Dragon.

Plot
A United Nations diplomat is murdered by being thrown off a building in a European nation.  His dying words are "the one eyed soldiers."  The murder and cryptic message lead to the police, to the diplomat's daughter and American reporter. A criminal syndicate led by a sadistic dwarf and a Sydney Greenstreet type smuggler and his mute assistant battle each other.

Cast 
Dale Robertson   ...  Richard Owen 
Luciana Paluzzi   ... Gava Berens 
Guy Deghy   ... Harold Schmidt / Zavo 
Andrew Faulds   ...  Colonel Ferrer 
Mile Avramovic   ... Antonio Caporelli 
Mirko Boman   ...  The Mute 
Bozidar Drnic   ...  Dr. Charles Berens
Dragan Nikolić   ...  Officer
Dusan Tadic ... Bandit
 Milan Bosiljcic ... Waiter

Production
In 1965 actor Dale Robertson formed his own production company United Screen Arts (USA). On 27 August of that year it was announced that USA announced a three way production deal between their company Yugoslavia's Avala Film and Switzerland to film The One Eyed Soldiers with Robertson and originally Rosanna Schiaffino.  The film was budgeted at US$1,700,000

Soundtrack
The film featured music from several different European films including Before It's Too Late from Agent 077: From the Orient with Fury.

References

External links
 

1966 films
Yugoslav crime films
1960s crime thriller films
British crime thriller films
Italian crime thriller films
English-language Italian films
English-language Yugoslav films
Films shot in Yugoslavia
Films set in Europe
1960s English-language films
1960s British films
1960s Italian films